The following article is a list of Canada national rugby league team results since they first started competing in International rugby league in 1987.

All-time records
Includes all Test Matches, 1987 – End 2018

1980s

1990s

2000s

2010s

See also

Canada Rugby League
Canada national rugby league team
Rugby league in Canada

References

Canada national rugby league team
Rugby league-related lists
Canada sport-related lists